Célio Lúcio da Costa Quarto (born 11 February 1971), known as Célio Lúcio, is a Brazilian football manager and former player who played as a central defender. He is the current manager of Goiás' under-20 squad.

Playing career
Born in Cajuri, Minas Gerais, Célio Lúcio was a Cruzeiro youth graduate. After making his first team debut in 1991, he subsequently became a starter and helped the club to win two Copa do Brasil and the 1997 Copa Libertadores; in the meantime, he also spent the 1995 season on loan at Palmeiras.

Célio Lúcio moved abroad in late 1997, joining S.C. Braga in Portugal, but returned to Brazil in July 1998 after signing for Coritiba on loan. After returning from loan, he spent a year without playing before joining Rio Branco-SP in 2000, but still owned by Braga.

Célio Lúcio subsequently represented América Mineiro, Goiás, Ipatinga, Olympic and União Rondonópolis, retiring with the latter in 2004 at the age of 33.

Manager career
Shortly after retiring, Célio Lúcio started working as an assistant manager, his first side being the under-20s of Francana, in 2005. He then worked for local sides before joining Cléber's staff at Metropolitano in 2010; the duo also worked together at Araxá in 2011. 

Célio Lúcio returned to Cruzeiro in June 2011, as an assistant manager of the under-20 side. He was named manager of the category in 2019, but was named assistant of the main squad in January 2020.

During the 2020 campaign, Célio Lúcio also worked as an interim manager on two occasions, after the departures of Ney Franco and Luiz Felipe Scolari.

Honours

Player
Cruzeiro
Campeonato Mineiro: 1992, 1994, 1996, 1997
Supercopa Libertadores: 1992
Copa do Brasil: 1993, 1996
Copa Libertadores: 1997

References

External links

1971 births
Living people
Sportspeople from Minas Gerais
Brazilian footballers
Association football defenders
Campeonato Brasileiro Série A players
Cruzeiro Esporte Clube players
Sociedade Esportiva Palmeiras players
Coritiba Foot Ball Club players
América Futebol Clube (MG) players
Goiás Esporte Clube players
Ipatinga Futebol Clube players
União Esporte Clube players
Primeira Liga players
S.C. Braga players
Brazilian expatriate footballers
Brazilian expatriate sportspeople in Portugal
Expatriate footballers in Portugal
Brazilian football managers
Campeonato Brasileiro Série B managers
Cruzeiro Esporte Clube managers